Poot may refer to:

People
 Eduardo Avelino Magaña Poot (born 1984), Mexican archer
 Marcel Poot (1901–88), Belgian classical music composer
 Pootie Poot, George W. Bush's nickname for Vladimir Putin
 Poot family, Belgian family

Arts, entertainment, and media
 Poot, a pet in My Teacher is an Alien
 Poot Carr, a fictional character on the HBO drama The Wire
 Poot! (comics), a British adult comic

Other uses
 Poot, slang for flatulence
 Poot, to aspirate, from the entomological term pooter (aspirator)

See also
 Poots